Jorge Washington Caraballo Larrosa (born May 5, 1959 in Treinta y Tres) is a former Uruguayan football player who has played in Uruguay, Italy, Ecuador, Brazil and Chile.

Teams
  Central Español 1977
  Danubio 1978-1982
  Pisa 1982-1983
  Machala 1983-1986
  Goiás 1986-1988
  Audaz Octubrino 1988-1990
  Fernandez Vial 1990-1991

References
 Profile at BDFA 

1959 births
Living people
People from Treinta y Tres
Uruguayan footballers
Uruguayan expatriate footballers
Uruguay international footballers
C.D. Arturo Fernández Vial footballers
Central Español players
Danubio F.C. players
Pisa S.C. players
Goiás Esporte Clube players
Chilean Primera División players
Serie A players
Expatriate footballers in Chile
Expatriate footballers in Brazil
Expatriate footballers in Italy
Expatriate footballers in Ecuador
Uruguayan expatriate sportspeople in Chile
Uruguayan expatriate sportspeople in Brazil
Uruguayan expatriate sportspeople in Italy
Uruguayan expatriate sportspeople in Ecuador
Association football midfielders